Israel sent 7 competitors to the 2007 World Championships in Athletics.

Men's 3000 metres steeplechase

Heats

Men's marathon

Final rankings

Marathon World Cup

Women's marathon

Men's high jump

Qualification - Group A

Men's pole vault

Qualification - Group B

Finals

Nations at the 2007 World Championships in Athletics
World Championships in Athletics
2007